Bagnall may refer to:

 Bagnall, Michigan, and unincorporated community
 Bagnall, Ontario, Canada
 Bagnall, Staffordshire, England
 Lansing Bagnall, British forklift truck manufacturing company
 W. G. Bagnall, British locomotive manufacturing company
 Bagnall Beach Observatory, astronomical observatory on the east coast of Australia

People
 Andrew Bagnall (born 1947), New Zealand motor racing driver
 Anthony Bagnall (born 1945), Royal Air Force commander
 Bill Bagnall (1926–2006), American magazine publisher and editor
 Charles Bagnall (1827–1884), British Politician
 Drew Bagnall (born 1983), Canadian ice hockey player
 Geoff Bagnall (born 1965), Australian rugby league footballer
 George Bagnall (1883–1964), British trade unionist
 Gibbons Bagnall (1719–1800), English poetical writer
 Graham Bagnall (1912–1986), New Zealand librarian, bibliographer and historian
 Hamer Bagnall (1904–1974), English cricketer
 James Bagnall (1783–1855), Canadian printer, publisher and politician
 James Eustace Bagnall (1830–1918), English botanist
 Jim Bagnall (fl. 1996–2011), Canadian politician from Prince Edward Island
 Joshua L. Bagnall (19th century), English songwriter
 Lemuel Bagnall (1844–1917), New Zealand businessman and politician
 Leone Bagnall (1933–2017), Canadian politician from Prince Edward Island
 Nigel Bagnall (1927–2002), British Army commander
 Richard Siddoway Bagnall (1889–1962), English entomologist
 Roger S. Bagnall (born 1947), professor of classics at Columbia University
 Walter Bagnall (1903–1984), Canadian Anglican bishop
 William Bagnall (1882–1950), New Zealand-born Australian politician
 William Gordon Bagnall (1852–1907), British founder of a locomotive manufacturing company

See also
 Bagenal
 Bagnal
 Bagnall-Oakeley
 Bagnell (disambiguation)
 Bignall (disambiguation)